Route 346 is a provincial highway located in the Lanaudière region of Quebec, Canada. It runs from the junctions of Route 125 and Route 337 in Sainte-Julienne and ends at Route 343 in Saint-Charles-Borromée. The route also runs concurrent with Route 341 in Saint-Liguori.

Municipalities along Route 346
 Sainte-Julienne
 Saint-Liguori
 Saint-Charles-Borromée

See also
 List of Quebec provincial highways

References

External links   
 Official Transports Quebec Map 
 Route 346 on Google Maps

346
Roads in Lanaudière